Moncove Lake State Park was created in 1990 by setting aside  of the Moncove Lake Wildlife Management Area to be operated as a state park. The park is located near Union in Monroe County, West Virginia. The park sits on the shores of  Moncove Lake, and underneath the flyway of the fall eastern hawk migration. The current park superintendent is John Dempsey, a West Virginia native and life-long resident.

Features 
 Moncove Lake
 48 camp sites (25 with electrical hookup)
 Outdoor swimming pool 
 Picnic area
 Hunting (in nearby Wildlife Management Area)
 Fishing
 Boating
 Hiking
 Bird watching

Accessibility

Accessibility for the disabled was assessed by West Virginia University. The assessment found the campground, picnic area, lake fishing and swimming pool to be accessible. The 2005 assessment found issues with certain handrails.

See also

List of West Virginia state parks
State park

References

External links
 

State parks of West Virginia
Protected areas of Monroe County, West Virginia
Protected areas established in 1990
Campgrounds in West Virginia
1990 establishments in West Virginia
IUCN Category III